Maria Hofstätter (born 30 March 1964) is an Austrian actress. She appeared in more than thirty films since 1993.

Selected filmography

References

External links 

1964 births
Living people
Austrian film actresses